Rowsom is a surname. Notable people with the surname include:

Brian Rowsom (born 1965), American basketball player and coach
Mark Rowsom (born 1959), Canadian pair skater

See also
Rowson